Cyrilia is a genus of parasitic alveolates in the phylum Apicomplexa. The genus was created by Lainson in 1981. Species in this genus infect fresh water fish and are transmitted by leeches.

Life cycle
The parasites are transmitted to the vertebrate host by the bite of a leech.

The parasite undergoes merogony and gametogony in the fish erythrocytes.

The mature gametocytes are ingested by a leech and undergo fusion, sygyny, sporogony and merogony in the leech.

Each zygote undergoes multiple divisions producing 16–32 sporozoites which are infective for vertebrate host.

Sporogony occurs in the intestinal wall of the leech.

Each of the microgametocyes produce four microgametes each capable of fertilizing a macrogamete.

Host relations
C. nili - African  catfish (Clarias lazera), Nile tilapia (Tilapia nilotica)

Vectors
C. nili - African fish leech (Batracobdelloides tricarinata Blanchard 1897)

References

Apicomplexa genera